Maadi is a rural locality in the Cassowary Coast Region, Queensland, Australia.

History 
The locality takes its name from a former railway station, named on 31 August 1922 by the Queensland Railways Department. The name is probably a corruption of the Palestinian place Maadan, a significant base area on the strategic railway built into the Sinai Peninsula in World War I, known to the Australian Light Horse units.

References 

Cassowary Coast Region
Localities in Queensland